Lowell High School may refer to:

Lowell High School (Lowell, Indiana)
Lowell High School (Lowell, Massachusetts)
Lowell High School (Lowell, Michigan)
Lowell High School (Lowell, North Carolina) (defunct)
Lowell High School (San Francisco)
Lowell High School (Whittier, California)
Lowell Junior/Senior High School (Lowell, Oregon)